Westerlund 1 (abbreviated Wd1, sometimes called Ara Cluster) is a compact young super star cluster about 3.8 kpc (12,000 ly) away from Earth. It is thought to be the most massive young star cluster in the Milky Way, and was discovered by Bengt Westerlund in 1961 but remained largely unstudied for many years due to high interstellar absorption in its direction. In the future, it will probably evolve into a globular cluster.

The cluster contains a large number of rare, evolved, high-mass stars, including: 6 yellow hypergiants, 4 red supergiants including Westerlund 1-26, one of the largest known stars, 24 Wolf-Rayet stars, a luminous blue variable, many OB supergiants, and an unusual supergiant sgB[e] star which has been proposed to be the remnant of a recent stellar merger. In addition, X-ray observations have revealed the presence of the anomalous X-ray pulsar CXO J164710.20-455217, a slow rotating neutron star that must have formed from a high-mass progenitor star. Westerlund 1 is believed to have formed in a single burst of star formation, implying the constituent stars have similar ages and compositions.

Aside from hosting some of the most massive and least-understood stars in our galaxy, Westerlund 1 is useful as a relatively nearby, easy to observe super star cluster that can help astronomers determine what occurs within extragalactic super star clusters.

Observations

The brightest O7-8V main sequence stars in Wd1 have V-band photometric magnitudes around 20.5, and therefore at visual wavelengths Wd1 is dominated by highly luminous post-Main Sequence stars (V-band magnitudes of 14.5–18, absolute magnitudes −7 to −10), along with less-luminous post-Main Sequence stars of luminosity class Ib and II (V-band magnitudes of 18–20). Due to the extremely high interstellar reddening towards Wd1, it is very difficult to observe in the U- and B-bands, and most observations are made in the R- or I-bands at the red end of the spectrum or in the infrared. Stars in the cluster are generally named using a classification introduced by Westerlund, although a separate naming convention is often used for the Wolf-Rayet stars.

At X-ray wavelengths, Wd1 shows diffuse emission from interstellar gas and point emission from both high-mass, post-Main Sequence and low mass, pre-Main Sequence stars. The Westerlund 1 magnetar is the most luminous X-ray point source in the cluster, with the sgB[e] star W9, the (presumed) binary W30a and the Wolf–Rayet stars WR A and WR B all strong X-ray sources. Approximately 50 other X-ray point sources are associated with luminous optical counterparts. Finally, at radio wavelengths the sgB[e] star W9 and red supergiants W20 and W26 are strong radio sources, while the majority of the cool hypergiants and a few OB supergiants and Wolf–Rayet stars are also detected.

Age and evolutionary state

The age of Wd1 is estimated at 4–5 Myr from comparison of the population of evolved stars with models of stellar evolution. The presence of significant numbers of both Wolf–Rayet stars and red and yellow supergiants in Wd1 represents a strong constraint on the age: theory suggests that red supergiants will not form until around 4 Myr as the most massive stars do not go through a red supergiant phase, while the Wolf–Rayet population declines sharply after 5 Myr. This range of ages is broadly consistent with infra-red observations of Wd1 that reveal the presence of late-O main sequence stars, although a lower age of around 3.5 Myr has been suggested from observations of lower-mass stars in Wd1.

If Wd1 formed stars with a typical initial mass function then the cluster would have originally contained a significant number of very massive stars, such as those currently observed in the younger Arches cluster. Current estimates of the age of Wd1 are greater than the lifetimes of these stars, and stellar evolution models suggest that there would already have been 50–150 supernovae in Wd1, with a supernova rate of approximately one per 10,000 years over the last million years. However, to date only one definitive supernova remnant has been detected—the Westerlund 1 magnetar—and the lack of other compact objects and high-mass X-ray binaries is puzzling. A number of suggestions have been put forward, including high supernova kick velocities that disrupt binary systems, the formation of slowly accreting (and therefore undetectable) stellar mass black holes, or binary systems in which both objects are now compact objects, but the problem has yet to be resolved.

As the stars in Westerlund 1 have the same age, composition and distance, the cluster represents an ideal environment for understanding the evolution of massive stars. The simultaneous presence of stars evolving on to and off of the Main Sequence presents a robust test for stellar evolution models, which are also currently unable to correctly predict the observed distribution of Wolf–Rayet subtypes in Westerlund 1.

Binary fraction
A number of lines of evidence point to a high binary fraction amongst the high-mass stars in Wd1. Some massive binaries are detected directly
through photometry and radial velocity observations, while many others are inferred through secondary characteristics (such as high X-ray luminosity, non-thermal radio spectra and excess infra-red emission) that are typical of colliding-wind binaries or dust-forming Wolf–Rayet stars. Overall binary fractions of 70% for the Wolf–Rayet population and in excess of 40% for the OB supergiants are currently estimated, although both may be incomplete.

Members
As well as documented members of the cluster, the luminous blue variable MN44 is thought to be a runaway star ejected from Westerlund 1 four to five million years ago.

References

External links 

 
 Artist’s impression of a magnetar X-ray satellites catch magnetar in gigantic stellar ‘hiccup’, ESA website, 2007
 Image of Westerlund 1
 Neutron star found where black hole expected

Open clusters
Super star clusters
Ara (constellation)
277-12
Astronomical objects discovered in 1961